Rodion Gorun Cămătaru (born 22 June 1958) is a Romanian former professional footballer who played as a striker.

Club career
Rodion Cămătaru was born on 22 June 1958 in Strehaia and debuted in Divizia A with Universitatea Craiova on 10 November 1974 in a 1–1 against CFR Cluj. He spent twelve seasons with Universitatea, scoring 122 goals in 288 Divizia A matches, being part of the "Craiova Maxima" generation that won two consecutive league titles in 1980 and 1981, in the first he contributed with 26 appearances in which he scored 17 goals and in the second he scored 23 goals in 33 matches, also winning four cups in the years 1977, 1978 in which he scored a goal in the 3–1 victory from the final against Olimpia Satu Mare, 1981 and 1983 in which he scored a double in the 2–1 final against Politehnica Timișoara and managed to reach the 1982–83 UEFA Cup semi-finals, making 9 appearances in the campaign. In 1986, he was transferred to Dinamo București, where he became the Divizia A top goalscorer and European Golden Boot winner in the first season spent at the club with 44 goals scored in 33 games, but as he scored 26 goals in the last 9 matches of the season, his European Golden Boot was retired because FIFA's investigations claimed the goals were scored unfairly and the trophy was awarded to Anton Polster, however Cămătaru was allowed to keep his copy of the trophy. In 1987 he was nominated for the Ballon d'Or. In 1989 he went to play in Belgium at Charleroi, after two seasons he moved in Netherlands at Heerenveen where he spent three seasons, scoring his last goal as a professional in the 1992–93 KNVB Cup final, which was lost with 6–2 in front of Ajax Amsterdam. He has a total of 378 Divizia A appearances in which he scored 198 goals and 47 matches played with 7 goals scored in European competitions. In 2020 with the occasion of Heerenveen's 100th anniversary, Cămătaru was selected the best striker in the club's history in front of Ruud van Nistelrooy and Klaas-Jan Huntelaar.

International career
Rodion Cămătaru played 73 matches and scored 21 goals for Romania, making his debut on 13 December 1978 under coach Ștefan Kovács in a friendly which ended with a 2–1 loss against Greece. He played two games at the Euro 1980 qualifiers and scored one goal in the 4–1 victory against Yugoslavia in the second leg of the 1977–80 Balkan Cup final. He played six games and scored two goals at the successful Euro 1984 qualifiers, also being used by coach Mircea Lucescu in all three group matches from the final tournament as Romania did not advance to the next stage. In the following years, Cămătaru played six games and scored three goals at the 1986 World Cup qualifiers, four games at the Euro 1988 qualifiers, five games and two goals scored at the successful 1990 World Cup qualifiers, being also part of the squad that participated at the final tournament where coach Emeric Jenei did not use him in any games. Cămătaru's last appearance for the national team was in a 2–1 loss against Scotland in which he scored Romania's goal at the Euro 1992 qualifiers.

For representing his country at the 1990 World Cup, Cămătaru was decorated by President of Romania Traian Băsescu on 25 March 2008 with the Ordinul "Meritul Sportiv" – (The Medal "The Sportive Merit") class III.

International goals
Scores and results list Romania's goal tally first, score column indicates score after each Cămătaru goal.

Honours
Universitatea Craiova
Divizia A: 1979–80, 1980–81
Cupa României: 1976–77, 1977–78, 1980–81, 1982–83
Romania
Balkan Cup: 1977–80

Individual
Divizia A top scorer: 1986–87
European Golden Shoe: 1986–87 (revoked)
Ballon d'Or: 1987 (21st place)

Notes

References

External links

Dutch league stats – Voetbal International 

1958 births
Living people
People from Strehaia
Romanian footballers
Romania international footballers
Romanian expatriate footballers
CS Universitatea Craiova players
FC Dinamo București players
R. Charleroi S.C. players
SC Heerenveen players
Liga I players
Belgian Pro League players
Eredivisie players
Romanian expatriate sportspeople in Belgium
Expatriate footballers in Belgium
Romanian expatriate sportspeople in the Netherlands
Expatriate footballers in the Netherlands
UEFA Euro 1984 players
1990 FIFA World Cup players
Association football forwards
Universiade medalists in football
Universiade bronze medalists for Romania